The Australian cricket team is the most successful team in the Cricket World Cup winning the 1987, 1999, 2003, 2007 and 2015 editions. This also makes them the only team to have won the world cup in all the regions (group of countries) that have hosted the world cup till now. Besides, Australia had reached the finals of the 1975 and 1996 World cups losing to West Indies and Sri Lanka respectively. They also reached quarterfinals of 2011 Cricket World Cup, and were knocked out in first round three times : 1979, 1983 and 1992. Though they have won world cup record five times, they are also the only team considered as tournament favorites for every world cup, right from 1975 to present. The team has played total 85 world cup matches, the highest of any team. Its overall win–loss record is 61-21 (which gives it the highest win percentage among all teams playing the world cup), with one tied match and two being abandoned due to rain.

Cricket World Cup Record

White: Group/Round-Robin Stage

Teamwise record

Australia at 1975 Cricket World Cup

The 1975 Cricket World Cup was the first Cricket World Cup. It was held in England in June 1975 and consisted of two weeks of one-day matches played 60-overs-a-side. The format consisted of a group stage, in which each team played the other three teams in its group of four. The top two teams from both groups would progress to the semifinals. Australia was placed in group B along with Pakistan, West Indies and Sri Lanka. For this world cup, the Australian side was led by Ian Chappell. The ODI format of cricket at that time was new for most teams, and Australia was among more experienced one day cricket teams at that time, with a decent batting and bowling lineup. So they were considered among tournament favorites.

Australia first played Pakistan at Leeds, and as expected, won the match. Australia won the toss and elected to bat first. All top order batsmen played well( Alan Turner, Rick McCosker, Ian Chappell and Greg Chappell). A quick 80 run off 94 balls of Ross Edwards took Australia to 278/7. Then a five wicket haul of Dennis Lillee helped Australia to bundle out Pakistan for 205. Australia then played non test playing Sri Lanka and were expected to easily win against the minnows. But though they won, their winning was not that one sided as expected. Once again Turner played well scoring a century (101 runs, 113 balls) and took Australia to mammoth 328. But Sri Lanka's batsmen played well and despite of Australia's strong bowling attack, were able to reach 276 in 60 overs. This match was also accompanied by lot of drama, as  Sunil Wettimuny and Duleep Mendis got retired hurt off Dennis Lillee's and Jeff Thomson's deliveries, and were playing well. In fact, Sri Lanka could have won the match if they remained at the crease. With this win, Australia progressed to the semifinals. The last group match of Australia was with West Indies, the team who was dominating world cricket at that time. West Indies won the toss and elected to field first. Except of Ross Edwards and Rod Marsh, who showed resistance scoring half centuries, the rest of the Australian lineup struggled against West Indian bowling attack led by Andy Roberts and Keith Boyce, and Australia were all out for 192. None of the Australian bowlers could make an impact as West Indies chased down the target with ease. With this loss, Australia finished second in group B and had to face England in semifinals.

Australia won the toss and choose to field on a bowling friendly wicket. The Australians dominated the first innings, and with the help of Gary Gilmour who took six wickets, bundled out England for 93. However, they received a terrible setback in second innings as they were reduced to 39/6. From then on, Gilmour and Doug Walters played patiently and took Australia to an uncertain victory. With this win Australia entered the finals where they had to face a strong West Indies, who were the only team to which they had lost so far in the tournament.

In the finals Australia won the toss and elected to field. West Indian captain Clive Lloyd scored a century and enabled west Indies to reach 291/8. Among Australia only Gilmour bowled well, taking six wickets. In chasing, the Australian batsmen's running between the wickets turned out to be very poor, and five of them were run out. In fact, they never looked to chase the target, and eventually lost by 17 runs.

Australia's win–loss record : 3-2(runners up)

West Indies' record : 5-0(champions)

Australia at the 1979 World Cup

The second edition of the Cricket World Cup was held in 1979 once again in England and with the same tournament format as in 1975. This time the Australian team for the world cup was almost entirely different from the 1975 Cricket World Cup, and was led by young batsmen Kim Hughes. The team was somewhat less experienced than previous squad, but still were expected to put a decent show. This time Australia was placed in Group A, along with England, Pakistan and associates Canada.

Australia began their campaign with a huge loss against tournament favourites England. Batting first, Australia were in a good situation, with Andrew Hilditch, Rick Darling and Allan Border taking Australia to 131/3. But after Border was dismissed, the middle order, consisting of Graham Yallop, Gary Cosier and Trevor Laughlin, collapsed in run outs. The tailenders were also easily taken over by English bowling, and Australia was bowled out for 159. Then a half century scored by Graham Gooch ensured England chasing the target without much hassle, reducing Australia's next two matches to must wins. Australia were then knocked out in next match against Pakistan. Pakistan, sent to bat first by Australia, scored 286/7 in 60 overs thanks to Majid Khan(61 runs, 107 balls) and skipper Asif Iqbal(61 runs, 75 balls), who received support from other batsmen as well. For Australia, Hilditch scored 72 and Yallop scored 37, but they received little support from other batsmen as they failed to withstand Majid Khan, Imran Khan and Sikander Bakht, who took 8 wickets in total. Eventually, Australia was bowled out for 197. Australia played for pride against Canada at Birmingham in their last group match. Australian bowler Alan Hurst(5/21) ripped through amateurish Canadian batting and bundled them out for 105. The score was easily chased down in 26 overs with the loss of 3 wickets. Despite this win, this tournament is considered as the worst ever world cup tournament for Australian team, as they lost to both test playing nations in their group in a completely one sided manner.

Australia's win–loss record : 1-2(Group A, 3rd place)

West Indies' record : 4-0 with one washout(champions)

Australia at the 1983 World Cup

Australia at the 1987 World Cup

Australia at the 1992 World Cup

Australia at the 1996 World Cup

Australia at the 1999 World Cup

.

Australia at the 2007 World Cup

Australia at the 2011 World Cup

Australia at the 2015 World Cup

Australia at the 2019 World Cup

References

External links

Cricket World Cup
History of the Cricket World Cup
Cricket World Cup